Hans Julius Brems (October 16, 1915 – September 16, 2000) was a Danish American economist. He was known for his contributions in mathematical economics, especially quantitative model-building.

Born in Viborg, Denmark, Brems earned his doctorate from the University of Copenhagen. Moving to the United States, he taught at the University of California, Berkeley, before joining the faculty at University of Illinois at Urbana–Champaign in 1954. Although most of his later work was in macro-economics, his most original contribution was by including quality competition in the Theory of Monopolistic Competition.

Selected publications

Books 
 (1951) Product Equilibrium under Monopolistic Competition Harvard University Press
 (1983) Fiscal Theory: Government, Inflation and Growth. Lexington Books. .
 (1967) Quantitative economic theory: a synthetic approach. Wiley. ASIN: B007SZ2GN4.
 (1973) Labour, Capital and Growth. Lexington Books. .
 (1986) Pioneering Economic Theory, 1630-1980: A Mathematical Restatement. The Johns Hopkins University Press. .

References 

1915 births
2000 deaths
University of Copenhagen alumni
University of Illinois Urbana-Champaign faculty
People from Viborg Municipality
20th-century American economists
Danish emigrants to the United States